Mayfield is a residential locality in the local government area (LGA) of Launceston in the Launceston LGA region of Tasmania. The 2016 census recorded a population of 1454 for the state suburb of Mayfield.
It is a state suburb in Tasmania. It is located north of Launceston. 

7% of Mayfield residents are indigenous peoples, and 20% are foreign born. Local employment is primarily in service industries, such as restaurants and groceries.

History 
Mayfield was gazetted as a locality in 1963. The area was previously a property called “Mayfield Estate”.

Geography
The Bell Bay Railway Line marks the north-eastern boundary.

Road infrastructure 
Route B81 (George Town Road) passes to the west. From there, several streets provide access to the locality.

References

Suburbs of Launceston, Tasmania
Localities of City of Launceston